The Bârlădel is a left tributary of the river Siret in Romania. It flows into the Siret near Șerbeștii Vechi. Before the regularization of the lower course of the Siret, it was a branch of the Siret, collecting several left tributaries of the Siret, including the Geru and the Suhu. Since the regularization works, the Geru discharges directly into the Siret, and the remaining course of the Bârladel collects the left Siret tributaries to the east of the Geru and the Suhu. The Bârlădel flows through the villages Independența, Vasile Alecsandri, Braniștea and Traian.

References

Rivers of Romania
Rivers of Galați County